Islam Roshdi (born 26 July 1989) is an Egyptian footballer playing for Egyptian club El Gouna. He primarily plays as an attacking midfielder.

External links

1992 births
Living people
Egyptian footballers
Association football midfielders
El Gouna FC players
El Minya SC players
Al Ahly SC players
Haras El Hodoud SC players
El Entag El Harby SC players